The  ("Imperial Year 2604 Medium Tank Model 7") was one of several medium tanks developed by the Imperial Japanese Army towards the end of World War II. While by far the most advanced Japanese wartime tank to reach production, industrial and material shortages resulted in only a few chassis being manufactured and only two known to be completed. Neither of the completed Type 4 Chi-To tanks saw combat use.

Design

The main armament was a turret-mounted long-barreled (4.23 m) Type 5 75 mm tank gun capable of being elevated between -6.5 to +20 degrees. The tank had a Type 97 heavy tank machine gun mounted in the hull and a ball mount on the side of the turret for a second machine gun.

Development
Development of the Type 4 Chi-To began in 1943 as an intended successor to the Type 97-Kai Shinhoto Chi-Ha. The Army Technical Bureau had been working on the Type 4 Chi-To as the counter to the M4 Sherman, but there were problems and delays in the program. As a result a stopgap tank was required. The Type 3 Chi-Nu medium tank was developed to cope with the M4 Sherman. Finally, the first prototype Type 4 Chi-To was delivered in 1944. Similar in its general layout, but significantly larger than the Type 97, it was the most advanced Japanese tank to reach the production stage.

Intended Type 4 Chi-To output was 25 tanks per month; with 20 to be made at Mitsubishi Heavy Industries and 5 to be produced at Kobe Seiko-sho. Late war shortage-induced delays caused by the severing of supply lines with conquered territories and U.S. strategic bombing of the Japanese mainland resulted in a total of six chassis being built. According to "The National Institute for Defense Studies, Ministry of Defense, Military Administration of Munitions Mobilization, Production Chart of January to April of 1945", the plan was to produce a total of 6 Type 4 Chi-To tanks in the first three months of 1945. Two Type 4 Chi-To tanks are known to have been completed in 1945 and neither saw combat.

At the end of World War II, two completed Type 4 Chi-To tanks were dumped into Lake Hamana in Shizuoka Prefecture to avoid capture by Allied occupation forces. One was recovered by the US Army, but the other was left in the lake. In 2013, there were efforts to locate the remaining tank, but it was not found.

Ka-To self-propelled gun

Another 105mm SP gun planned was the Ka-To or Ka-To Sha 105 mm SP AT Gun. Ka-To's development was ordered in 1943. The engine placement was forward, while the gun placement was in the rear section of the hull. The open top superstructure was based on the Type 5 Na-To. Two main guns for the Ka-To were completed in 1945. According to several sources, the Ka-To hull was based on the Type 4 Chi-To, which needed to be extended in length to accommodate the main gun. An extra road wheel was added to each side of the chassis. However, according to another source, the incomplete Ka-To hull was based on the Type 5 Chi-Ri medium tank.

Tanks of comparable role, performance and era
 Soviet T-34-85
 German Panther
 British Comet
 American M4A3E8 "Easy Eight"

Gallery

References

Sources

Further reading
 
 
 Gander, Terry J. (1995). Jane's Tanks of World War II. Harper Collins. .

External links
 
 Taki's Imperial Japanese Army Page - Akira Takizawa
 Japan search for super tank that never saw action - The Telegraph, 12 April 2013 (accessed 2017-06-17)

4 Chi-To
Type 4 Chi-To
Military vehicles introduced from 1945 to 1949